Yuna Loaëc (born 17 May 2001) is a French professional squash player. She achieved her highest career PSA ranking of 160 in May 2021 during the 2020-21 PSA World Tour.

References

External links 
 
 

2000 births
Living people
French female squash players
People from Poissy